Turbonilla aracruzensis is a species of sea snail, a marine gastropod mollusk in the family Pyramidellidae, the pyrams and their allies.

Description
The shell grows to a length of 5.4 mm.

Distribution
The type specimen was found in the Atlantic Ocean off Aracruz, Espírito Santo State, Brazil, at depths between 28 m and 69 m.

References

External links
 To Encyclopedia of Life
 To World Register of Marine Species

aracruzensis
Gastropods described in 2004